Leif Haugen (22 September 1917 – 26 February 2001) was a Norwegian cross-country skier.

He was born in Lillehammer, and represented the club Lillehammer SK. He competed in cross-country skiing at the 1948 Winter Olympics.

Cross-country skiing results

Olympic Games

References

External links

1917 births
2001 deaths
Sportspeople from Lillehammer
Norwegian male cross-country skiers
Olympic cross-country skiers of Norway
Cross-country skiers at the 1948 Winter Olympics
20th-century Norwegian people